Mushin 2 Mo’Hits (M2M) is the debut album by Nigerian singer Wande Coal. It was launched on April 12, 2009, under the Mo' Hits Records now Mavin Records. The album was produced by Don Jazzy and it featured a number of other artist including D'banj, Dr SID, D'Prince, K-Switch.

Track listing

References 

2009 debut albums
Rhythm and blues albums by Nigerian artists